Boletus pallidus is an edible species of bolete fungus. It was described by Charles Christopher Frost in 1874. The bolete was reported from a Mexican beech (Fagus mexicana) forest in Hidalgo, Mexico in 2010.

See also
List of Boletus species
List of North American boletes

References

External links

pallidus
Edible fungi
Fungi described in 1874
Fungi of North America